Kolár may refer to:

 Auguste Auspitz-Kolár (1844–1878), Bohemian-born Austrian pianist and composer
 Josef Jiří Kolár (1812–1896), Czech theatrical actor, director, translator and writer
 Ľuboš Kolár (born 1989), Slovak football player

See also
 Kolar (surname)
 Kolář